Seo Ji-eum (born December 15, 1986), is a South Korean lyricist and singer. She started getting recognition after writing the lyrics for Girls' Generation-TTS's "Twinkle" and f(x)'s "Electric Shock". She won the Lyricist of the Year Award at the 2018 Gaon Chart Music Awards. She released her debut single "Greenroom" on March 27, 2021.

Songwriting credits 
All songwriting credits are adapted from the Korea Music Copyright Association's database, unless otherwise noted.

2010s

Discography

Single albums

Singles

Awards and nominations

References

External links 

1986 births
Living people
K-pop singers
21st-century South Korean women singers
South Korean lyricists